Kanchiraviali, commonly called KCV, is a place near  Muttom road Eraniel in the Kanyakumari district in the state of Tamil Nadu, India.

Kanyakumari district